This is a list of websites that are blocked in Singapore. Under the responsibility of the Infocomm Media Development Authority (IMDA), these websites are mainly unlicensed gambling, pimping (known as vice related activities), copyright infringement/piracy, and for spreading falsehoods. Some websites may be blocked as suspected scam websites. However, websites that are blocked in Singapore are easily circumvented by a DNS change without the need to use a VPN.

As of 2019, there were 202 vice related websites blocked by Singaporean authorities.

Table of blocked websites

References

See also 
 Internet censorship in Singapore

Singapore
Internet censorship in Singapore
Blocked,Singapore
Singapore communications-related lists